Bad Company is a 1986 Argentine drama film written and directed by José Santiso and starring Federico Luppi, Bárbara Mújica and Miguel Ángel Solá.

The film is based on a play by Jacobo Langsner called Pater noster, which premiered in Uruguay in 1977 and was first staged in Argentina in 1981 by Teatro Abierto. The film is a "thinly veiled allegory of life under a dictatorship" and treats the topic of the Dirty War by denouncing "the complicity of large sectors of the civil population with the military." It earned praise as "the most profound, disturbing, uncompromising, and novel of all the films of the new democratic period to examine the years of terror."

Synopsis
An impoverished middle-class couple rents a room in an apartment from an artist, who refuses to let them cook food in the apartment and keeps them awake at night, living a life of debauchery. The artist charges them enough for the room to cover the entire rent of the apartment. After the husband is attacked by a lunatic who appears to be the artist's brother, the couple takes over the apartment and ties the artist to a chair with barbed wire. They force him to eat red meat (he had been living on bread and milk) and attempt to cure him of "unhealthy lifestyle"; finally, they dismember him. The audience's perspective has changed: initially sympathizing with the couple, it becomes clear that they are a metaphor of the Argentinian bourgeoisie which was complicit in the "systematic slaughter of some 30,000 students, trade unionists, schoolteachers, and others accused of being 'terrorists.'"

Cast
 Federico Luppi as Bernardo
 Bárbara Mujica as Amalia 
 Miguel Ángel Solá as Néstor
  Edgardo Moreira as 	Puppeteer
  Florencia Firpo as 	Angelita
  Jorge Petraglia as Blind Man
  Silvia Milet
  Susana Nova
  Jorge Capobianco
 Martín Droso
 Gianni Fiori
 Mónica Lacoste
 Laura Orgambide
 Rubén Santagada

References

External links
 
 Malayunta Cinenacional.com

1986 films
1986 drama films
Allegory
Argentine films based on plays
1980s Spanish-language films
Argentine drama films
1980s Argentine films